Kunnathur is a panchayat town in Tirupur district in the Indian state of Tamil Nadu. It was previously under the jurisdiction of the Erode district. However kunnathur is in tiruppur district, legislative assembly consistency for kunnathur is Perundurai which is in Erode district.

Kunnathur is famous for producing compressors and loaders, and for its borewells.

Demographics

In the 2001 India census, Kunnathur had a population of 7,031. According to the Census, males and females each makeup 50% of the population. Kunnathur has an average literacy rate of 72%, which is higher than the national average of 59.5%. Male literacy is 80%, and female literacy is 64%. In Kunnathur, 9% of the population is under six years of age. The size of the area is approximately 8.94 square kilometers.

Facilities

The Kunnathur government hospital, is located in Kunnathur.

Economy 

There are commercial banks, cooperative banks and agriculture society in Kunnathar.

Landmark 
Kunnathur is home to a historic Lakshmi Narayanan Temple built by the Chera Dynasty in the 12th century.

Transport 

All buses from Tirupur to Gobichettipalayam and Gobichettipalaym to Coimbatore pass through Kunnathur and have a one minute halt. A bus arrives every 15 to 20 minutes. One also can come to Perumanallur and take the buses from Salem to Coimbatore.
The buses from Tirupur to Erode pass through Kunnathur with a one minute stop. There is a bus every three hours.
The closest airport is the Coimbatore International Airport, 9.87 km away.
The nearest railway station is Periyanaikanpalayam which is 8.7 km away.

Education 

Schools include:
 Saraswathi Kalvi Nilayam Matriculation Higher Secondary School,
 Kongu Vellalar Nursery and Primary School,
 Kongu Matriculation Higher Secondary School,
 Karupana Nadar Higher Secondary School,
 Government Higher Secondary School for Girls, and
 Government Higher Secondary School for Boys,
 Karumanchirai Government School,
 Kumaran Billabong

References

Cities and towns in Tiruppur district